Air chief marshal Sir Norman Howard Bottomley,  (18 September 1891 – 13 August 1970) was the successor to Arthur 'Bomber' Harris as Commander-in-Chief of RAF Bomber Command in 1945.

RAF career
Born in Ripponden, West Riding of Yorkshire, Bottomley was educated at Halifax School and the University of Rennes in Brittany before being commissioned into the East Yorkshire Regiment in 1914 during World War I. He served with his Regiment until transferring to the Royal Flying Corps in 1915 and becoming a pilot with No. 47 Squadron.

Between the wars, Bottomley's appointments included service in the Middle East and the command of No. 4 (AC) Squadron RAF from 1928 and No. 1 (Indian) Group from 1934. Bottomley was Senior Air Staff Officer at Bomber Command headquarters between 1938 and 1940, continuing in that role at the start of World War II, and was then appointed Air Officer Commanding No. 5 Group in November 1940. He was moved to Deputy Chief of the Air Staff in 1941 and then Assistant Chief of the Air Staff (Operations) in 1942 before reverting to Deputy Chief of the Air Staff in 1943. On 15 September 1945, he followed Sir Arthur 'Bomber' Harris as Commander-in-Chief Bomber Command, retaining command until 16 January 1947.

Bottomley became Inspector-General of the RAF in 1947 and retired on 1 January 1948.

From 1948 until 1956, he held the post of director of administration at the BBC, acting as director general when Sir Ian Jacob was away.

References

External links

1940 Photographs of Bottomley held by the National Portrait Gallery, London
Letter from Bufton to Bottomley re Dambusters Raid

|-

|-

|-

1891 births
1970 deaths
East Yorkshire Regiment officers
Royal Flying Corps officers
British Army personnel of World War I
Royal Air Force air marshals
Knights Commander of the Order of the Bath
Companions of the Order of the Indian Empire
Companions of the Distinguished Service Order
Recipients of the Air Force Cross (United Kingdom)
Commanders of the Legion of Merit
Royal Air Force personnel of World War II
People from Calderdale (district)
Military personnel from Yorkshire